Świniec  is a village in the administrative district of Gmina Kamień Pomorski, within Kamień County, West Pomeranian Voivodeship, in north-western Poland. The village has a population of 110.

See also 

 History of Pomerania

References

Villages in Kamień County